Deh-e Kharabeh Kand (also Romanized as Deh-e Kharābeh Kand; also known as Deh-e Kharābeh Kan, Kharābeh Kand, and Kharābeh-ye Kandeh) is a village in Hendudur Rural District, Sarband District, Shazand County, Markazi Province, Iran. At the 2006 census, its population was 46, in 10 families.

References 

Populated places in Shazand County